Fidelity National Information Services, Inc. (FIS) is an American multinational corporation which offers a wide range of financial products and services. FIS is most known for its development of Financial Technology, or FinTech, and as of Q2 2020 it offers its solutions in three primary segments: Merchant Solutions, Banking Solutions, and Capital Market Solutions. Annually, FIS facilitates the movement of roughly $9 trillion through the processing of approximately 75 billion transactions in service to more than 20,000 clients around the globe.

FIS was ranked second in the FinTech Forward 2016 rankings. After finalizing FIS' most recent deal to acquire Worldpay for $35 billion in Q3 of 2019, FIS became the largest processing and payments company in the world.

Operations 
FIS has a portfolio of products for the financial services sector, including both retail and investment banking.

They include "Profile" ― a banking application based on the open source GT.M, a transaction processing database engine maintained by FIS.

Mergers and acquisitions

Throughout its history, FIS has made many acquisitions. It's largest to date would have been the reported merger with Global Payments, a deal estimated around US$70 billion, but which fell apart at the last minute in December 2020.

 Alltel Information Services, 2003 $1.05 billion
 WebTone Technologies, 2003
 Sanchez Computer Associates, 2004 $175 million
 Aurum Technology, 2004
 BankWare, 2004
 InterCept, 2004
 Kordoba GmbH & Co, 2004 $163.2 million 
 Merger with Certegy Inc.,2006 $1.8 billion 
 eFunds Corporation (EFD) 
 Metavante Corporation, 2009 $2.94 billion in stock 
 Compliance Coach, Inc, 2010
 Capco, 2010,  $292 million. In May 2017 FIS sold a 60% stake in Capco to CD&R funds for $477 million.
 TDWI ― Toronto Dominion Wealth Institutional - now re-branded as Platform Securities, 2013
 mFoundry, 2013, $120 million
 CMSI, 2014
 Reliance Trust Company, 2014 $110 million
 Clear2Pay, 2014 $480 million
 SunGard Data Systems, 2015 $9.1 billion
 Worldpay, Inc., 2019 $43 billion
 Payrix, 2022, 

In February 2023, in the wake of pressure from activist investors, the company announced it would spin off its merchant business that consisted of Worldpay in the next 12 months. The move came at a time when other conglomerates like GE and Johnson & Johnson, were in the process of splitting off their various lines of business.

Finances 
A 50% year-over-year increase in Quarterly Revenue was reported in FIS' Q1 2020 Earnings Report, climbing from $2.07 billion to $3.01 billion, while Adjusted Net Earnings more than doubled (+112%) from $378 Million to $802 Million. According to FIS Q1 2020 Earnings Report, a majority of these substantial increases can be attributed to the historically massive $35 billion merger/acquisition deal with Worldpay Inc. which closed in Q3 2019.

For the fiscal year 2017, FIS reported earnings of US$1.319 billion, with an annual revenue of US$9.123 billion, a decrease of 1.3% over the previous fiscal cycle. FIS shares traded at over $106 per share, and its market capitalization was valued at over US$33 billion in November 2018.

Controversies

On July 3, 2007, Certegy Check Services, part of FIS, announced that a worker at one of its subsidiaries stole 2.3 million consumer records containing credit card, bank account, and other personal information. This estimate was later increased to 8.5 million consumer records. The next month, a law firm filed a class-action lawsuit against CCS and parent company FIS based on the privacy breach; the firm claims that, since CCS provides check-verification services to many major U.S. stores, "consumers do not choose to use the services of these companies but rather are forced to do so".

In August 2011, Florida based eFunds Prepaid Solutions, part of FIS, was the victim of a sophisticated cyberattack that saw hackers steal $13 million from ATMs using 22 stolen prepaid cards belonging to a single client of FIS.

References

External links
 

 
1968 establishments in Florida
Companies listed on the New York Stock Exchange
Software companies based in Florida
Companies based in Jacksonville, Florida
Financial services companies established in 1968
American companies established in 1968
Software companies established in 1968
Credit scoring
Multinational companies headquartered in the United States
Financial technology companies
Financial services companies of the United States
Financial software companies
Brooklyn, Jacksonville
Financial services companies based in Jacksonville, Florida
Software companies of the United States
Banking software companies
Technology companies based in the Jacksonville area
Technology companies based in Florida
Publicly traded companies based in Jacksonville, Florida
Multinational companies based in Jacksonville